Barsha Lekhi (Nepali:) (born May 5, 1993) is a beauty queen and an environmental activist. She was crowned Miss Nepal in 2016, won Missiology People's Choice award in 2016, and represented Nepal at the Miss International contest held in Japan on October 27, 2016.
Lekhi completed her Environmental Science education from Patan Multiple Campus and has worked at the NEFIN-REDD/CC Partnership Program. Currently, she is pursuing her Master's Degree in Environmental Science at Jawaharlal Nehru University

Career
Barsha entered the Miss Nepal 2016 pageant as competitor number 14 and was subsequently crowned Miss Nepal International 2016. She also earned the Miss Popular title.

Miss Nepal 2016
Barsha is the first Miss Nepal from a Tharu community.

Miss International 2016
Barsha Lekhi competed in Miss International 2016 pageant held on October 27, 2016, in Tokyo Dome City Hall, Tokyo, Japan.

References

External links
 Official Website

1994 births
Living people
Miss International 2016 delegates
Miss Nepal winners
Nepalese female models
Nepalese activists
Nepalese environmentalists
Nepalese beauty pageant winners
People from Saptari District